A turncoat is a person who shifts allegiance from one loyalty or ideal to another, betraying or deserting an original cause by switching to the opposing side or party. In political and social history, this is distinct from being a traitor, as the switch mostly takes place under the following circumstances:
In groups, often driven by one or more leaders.
When the goal that formerly motivated and benefited the person becomes (or is perceived as having become) either no longer feasible or too costly even if success is achieved.

From a military perspective, opposing armies generally wear uniforms of contrasting colors to prevent incidents of friendly fire.  Thus the term "turn-coat" indicates that an individual has changed sides and his uniform coat to one matching the color of his former enemy.  For example, in the English Civil War during the 17th century, Oliver Cromwell's soldiers turned their coats inside out to match the colors of the Royal army (see Examples below).

Historical context
Even in a modern historical context "turncoat" is often synonymous with the term "renegade", a term of religious origins having its origins in the Latin word "renegare" (to deny). Historical currents of great magnitude have periodically caught masses of people, along with their leaders, in their wake. In such a dire situation, new perspectives on past actions are laid bare and the question of personal treason becomes muddled. One example would be the situation that led to the Act of Abjuration or Plakkaat van Verlatinghe, signed on July 26, 1581, in the Netherlands, an instance where changing sides was given a positive meaning.

The first written use of the term meaning was by J. Foxe in Actes & Monuments in 1570: "One who changes his principles or party; a renegade; an apostate." Cited 1571*

"Turncoat" could also have a more literal origin. According to the Rotuli Chartarum 1199–1216 two barons changed fealty from William Marshal, 1st Earl of Pembroke, to King John. In other words, they turned their coats (of arms) from one lord to another, hence turncoat.

Process
A mass-shift in allegiance by a population may take place during military occupation, after a nation has been defeated in war or after a major social upheaval, such as a revolution. Following the initial traumatic times, many of the citizens of the area in question quickly embrace the cause of the victors to benefit from the new system. This shift of allegiance is often done without much knowledge about the new order that is replacing the former one. In the face of fear and insecurity, the prime motive for a turncoat to draw away from former allegiances may be mere survival.

Often the leaders are the first to change loyalties, for they have had access to privileged information and are more aware of the hopelessness of the situation for their former cause. This is especially apparent in dictatorships and authoritarian states when most of the population has been fed propaganda and triumphalism and has been kept in the dark about important turns of events.

Aftermath
As time goes by, along with the embracing of life under the new circumstances comes a need of burying and rewriting the past by concealing evidence. The fear of the past coming to upset the newly found stability is always present in the mind of the turncoat. The past is rewritten and whitewashed to cover former deeds. When successful, this activity results in the distortion and falsification of historical events.

Even after the death of a turncoat his family and friends may wish to keep uncomfortable secrets from the past out of the light. There is a fear of loss of prestige as well as a wish to honor the memory of a family member from the part of those who have experienced the positive side of the person.

In certain countries, individuals and organizations have actively investigated the past to bring turncoats to justice to face their responsibilities.

Examples 
There were many turncoats in history, including:

The English Civil War during the 17th century.  The siege of Corfe Castle was won by Oliver Cromwell's soldiers when they turned their coats inside out to match the colors of the Royal army.
During the revolution of the British American colonies when U.S. Continental Army Major General Benedict Arnold defected to the side of the British in May 1779.
Canada during the War of 1812. Some Canadians felt republicanism was a better system of government than the democratic British monarchy and fought on the side of the invading Americans. 
Germany and Austria after World War II when many former enthusiastic members of the Nazi Party embraced the newly created nations of West Germany or East Germany and sought to erase or at least minimize their former role as Nazis. During the decades that followed, many former Nazis regained prestige and held high posts in the new republics. Kurt Waldheim, an Austrian Nazi, even held the highest post as Secretary-General of the United Nations from 1972 to 1981 and as President of Austria from 1986 to 1992.
France after the downfall of the Vichy Regime, when many collaborationists, whether home-grown fascists or Nazi sympathizers, played down their role in the former government and its institutions.
Iran after the overthrow of the last Shah Mohammed Reza Pahlavi's regime. At that time many persons who had formerly led a life based on secular and liberal values and who had fervently supported the Iranian monarchy suddenly embraced the stern religious values imposed by Ayatollah Khomeini's regime with unbridled fervor.
Russia and the former Communist Eastern European countries after the fall of the USSR, where many former communists suddenly became fervent supporters of capitalism. As a result, many former apparatchiks abandoned the Communist Party in favor of positions in the new government structures.
In Spain after the Spanish Civil War (1936–1939), and again during the Spanish transition to democracy (1975 onwards).

See also
Abjuration
Benedict Arnold a general who originally fought for the American Continental Army but defected to the British Army
Collaboration with the Axis Powers during World War II
Cover-up
Defection
Dual loyalty in politics
Flip-flop (politics)
Historical revisionism (negationism), falsification of history
History of the Soviet Union (1982–1991)
Dissolution of the Soviet Union
Jacques Dutronc whose song L'opportuniste is about being a turncoat
List of former Nazi Party members
Nazi hunter
Pursuit of Nazi collaborators
Quisling
Whitewash (censorship)

References 

Human behavior
Deception
Political science
Defectors by type